Cucciari is an Italian surname. Notable people with the surname include:

Alessandro Cucciari (born 1969), Italian footballer and manager
Geppi Cucciari (born 1973), Italian stand-up comedian, actress, and television presenter

Italian-language surnames